Coconut Motion Pictures is an Indian film production, distribution and marketing company established by Rashmin Majithia.

The company has ventures in the exhibition sector, having 8 cinema properties in Gujarat and in the process of acquiring more properties.

History

Films 
The company has produced a regional full length feature film: ‘Hameer ‘, a bilingual starring Ravi Kishan and Hiten Kumar in lead roles which was released on 13 January 2017. The company has also co-produced a romantic, thriller, comedy film Ranchi Diaries Directed by Sattwik Mohanty starring Anupam Kher, Jimmy Shergill, Satish Kaushik, Himansh Kohli, Soundarya Sharma, Taaha Shah Badusha, Hariharsudhan Balasubramani & Pradeep Singh.which will release on 13 October 2017. The company has produced a Gujarati feature film ‘Best Of Luck Laalu’ Directed by Vipul Mehta starring Supriya Pathak Kapur, Muni Dilip Jha, Smit Ganatra, Simran Natekar, Rishabh Joshi Kurush Deboo, Abhay Harpale and Harshiv Shah.

The company’s distribution arm was kicked off with the release of a Gujarati film, ‘Passport’ starring Malhar Thakar, on 4 November 2016, Rings which released in India on 10 February 2017 and Half Girlfriend on 19 May 2017. Coconut Movies recently acquired four upcoming titles from T-series for overseas theatrical exploitation. These includes: Raabta starring Sushant Singh Rajput and Kriti Sanon. Movie releases on 9 June 2017. Baadshaho starring Ajay Devgn, Emraan Hashmi, Ileana D’Cruz, Esha Gupta, Vidyut Jammwal and Aishwarya Rai Bachchan. Movie releases on 1 September 2017. Simran starring Kangana Ranaut. Movie releases on 15 September 2017. Tumhari Sulu starring Vidya Balan. Movie releases on 1 December 2017.

Films Produced

Film Distributed

References

External links 
 

Film distributors of India
Film production companies based in Mumbai
Companies with year of establishment missing